The North America Prairies is a large grassland floristic province within the North American Atlantic Region, a floristic region within the Holarctic Kingdom. It lies between the Appalachian Province and the Rocky Mountains and includes the prairies of the Great Plains. It is bounded by the Canadian coniferous forests on the north and the arid semideserts to the southwest. The province itself is occupied by temperate grasslands, savannas, and shrublands (including such ecoregions as the Flint Hills tallgrass prairie, Sand Hills, High Plains). Endemism is rather limited in this province, and its boundaries are vague. During the Pleistocene much of the province was glaciated.

Plants
Select plant species of the North American Prairie Province include:
Andropogon gerardi - big bluestem
Bouteloua gracilis - blue grama
Bouteloua dactyloides - buffalo grass
Echinacea purpurea - purple coneflower
Eustoma russellianum - Texas bluebell
Lespedeza leptostachya - prairie bush-Clover
Phlox oklahomensis - Oklahoma phlox
Sorghastrum nutans - indiangrass

References

Floristic provinces
Temperate grasslands, savannas, and shrublands
Prairies
Ecoregions of Canada
Nearctic ecoregions